The 1980 AFC Women's Championship was the 3rd edition of the AFC Women's Championship (now the AFC Women's Asian Cup). The tournament was hosted by India (with two teams India N and India S) and was the first time the competition was held in South Asia. It was originally scheduled to be held in 1979, but was eventually held between 11 and 20 January 1980. All matches were played at the EMS Stadium in Calicut (now Kozhikode), Kerala. 

The tournament was won by the Republic of China (Taiwan) for the second time.

Venue
All matches were held at the EMS Stadium in Calicut (now Kozhikode), Kerala.

Entrants

Notes

Group stage

Knockout stage

Semi-final

Third place match

Final

Winner

References

External links
 RSSSF.com
 Contgames-Women

Women's Championship
AFC Women's Asian Cup tournaments
International association football competitions hosted by India
Afc
AFC Women's Championship
AFC Women's Championship
1980 in Indian women's sport